Ghar Kab Ao Gey is a Pakistani Urdu language action film directed by Iqbal Kashmiri. Released across theaters in Pakistan on Eid-ul-Fittar, 9 January 2000.

Plot 
Terrorists named Prithvi and Charles Sobhraj begin the film by bombing Karachi. They are Hindu and Jewish extremists. A Pakistani commando team is sent abroad to kill them.Commandos including Shan and Ahsan Khan go to Sobrash's Island and a Hindu lady Reema helps them. They kill Sobrash and other terrorists toward the end, followed by the demise of Shan Shahid.

Reception
This film was a hit film at the box office.

Cast
 Shaan as Major 
 Saima as Jiya
 Javed Sheikh as Charles Sobraj
 Babar Ali as Oberoi
 Sana as Dr. Nishay
 Meera as Sarah
 Jia Ali as Naseeka
 Ahsan Khan as Captain Amir
 Zeeshan as Captain Ali
 Noor as Amna Ghauri

Accolades

Music
Music of this film was composed by music director Amjad Bobby. A noted Indian choreographer Saroj Khan choreographed songs for this film.

References

2000s Urdu-language films
2000 films
Pakistani action films
Films about terrorism in Asia
Urdu-language Pakistani films
2000 action films